
Jack or Jackie Wilson may refer to:
Entertainment
 Jack Wilson (1894–1970), vaudeville actor, part of Wilson, Keppel and Betty
 Jack Wilson (pianist) (1907–2006), British jazz pianist from Warwickshire, England
 Jackie Wilson (1934–1984), American soul and R&B singer
 Jack Wilson (jazz pianist) (1936–2007), American jazz pianist from Chicago
 Jack Wilson (writer) (1937–1997), Northern Irish novelist
 Jack Wilson (Home and Away), a character in the Australian soap opera Home and Away

Sports
 Jack Wilson (Yorkshire cricketer) (1889–1959), British cricketer, World War I pilot, and jockey
 Jack Wilson (footballer) (1897–?), English footballer
 Jackie Wilson (boxer) (1909–1966), American boxer
 Jack Wilson (pitcher) (1912–1995), pitcher in baseball
 Jack Wilson (rower) (1914–1997), British rower and Olympic champion in 1948
 Jack Wilson (American football) (1917–2001), first-round pick of the Cleveland Rams in 1942
 Jack Wilson (boxer) (1918–1956), American boxer and Olympic medalist in 1936
 Jack Wilson (Australian cricketer) (1921–1985), Australian cricketer
 Jack Wilson (basketball) (1936–1986), American college basketball player and high school basketball coach
 Jack Wilson (infielder) (born 1977), former American baseball player
 Jack Wilson (rugby union) (born 1989), New Zealand rugby union player

Other
 Wovoka (1856–1932), Northern Paiute Indian prophet also known as Jack Wilson
 Jack Wilson (engineer) (1905–1972), English-Australian engineer and founder of Wilson Transformers
 Jack M. Wilson (born 1945), President of the University of Massachusetts
 Jack Wilson (judge) (born 1978/9), American judge
 Jack Wilson (political advisor) (born 1996), Britain's youngest senior political advisor as of 2017
 Jack Wilson (security guard) (born c. 1948), American elderly security guard who single-handedly ended the West Freeway Church of Christ shooting by shooting the perpetrator in the head from a distance

See also
Jocky Wilson (1950–2012), Scottish professional darts player
John Wilson (disambiguation)
Johnny Wilson (disambiguation)